J.J. McCoy was an American racecar driver who participated in 1919 Indianapolis 500.

Indianapolis 500
J.J. McCoy, of Ortonville, Minnesota, competed at the Indianapolis track once before, as a member of the Velie Motors Corporation team in the inaugural contest on the brick oval at the 1911 Indianapolis 500 without getting into the money, however. During the last few years McCoy has been appearing with success in dirt track contests throughout the northwest, and he also competed in a couple of the events held on the Minneapolis speedway.

Indy 500 results

References

Indianapolis 500 drivers
Year of birth missing
Year of death missing
People from Ortonville, Minnesota